Lleyton Hewitt was the defending champion, but lost to compatriot Sam Groth in the first round.

Roger Federer won the title, defeating Milos Raonic in the final, 6–4, 6–7(2–7), 6–4, and in the process recorded his 1,000th match victory on the professional tour.

Seeds
The top four seeds receive a bye into the second round.

 Roger Federer (champion)
 Kei Nishikori (semifinals)
 Milos Raonic (final)
 Grigor Dimitrov (semifinals)
 Kevin Anderson (first round)
 Gilles Simon (first round)
 Alexandr Dolgopolov (second round)
 Julien Benneteau (first round)

Draw

Finals

Top half

Bottom half

Qualifying

Seeds

 Tobias Kamke (second round)
 Viktor Troicki (qualifying competition)
 Marsel İlhan (qualifying competition)
 Pierre-Hugues Herbert (second round)
 Tim Smyczek (second round)
 Denis Kudla (qualified)
 Norbert Gombos (second round)
 Lucas Pouille (first round)

Qualifiers

Qualifying draw

First qualifier

Second qualifier

Third qualifier

Fourth qualifier

References
 Main Draw
 Qualifying Draw

2015 ATP World Tour
Men's Singles